Eurostopodus is a genus of eared nightjar in the family Caprimulgidae. This genus is distinctive among the Old World nightjars in lacking long rictal bristles. It also shows some features that are not shared with Caprimulginae and Chordeilinae, like having a larger size or the variable presence of ear-tufts, juveniles showing rufous plumage, long incubation periods and brown-reds and black spotted eggs.

Species
The genus contains the following seven species:

References

 
Bird genera